The  2nd Robert Awards ceremony was held on 31 March 1985 in Copenhagen, Denmark. Organized by the Danish Film Academy, the awards honoured the best in Danish and foreign film of 1984.

Honorees

Best Danish Film 
 The Element of Crime – Lars von Trier

Best Screenplay 
 Bjarne Reuter & Bille August – Twist and Shout

Best Actor in a Leading Role 
 Lars Simonsen – Twist and Shout

Best Actress in a Leading Role 
 Bodil Udsen –

Best Actor in a Supporting Role 
 Bent Mejding – Twist and Shout

Best Actress in a Supporting Role 
 Aase Hansen – Twist and Shout

Best Cinematography 
  – The Element of Crime

Best Production Design 
  – The Element of Crime

Best Costume Design 
 Manon Rasmussen – The Element of Crime

Best Special Effects 
  – The Element of Crime

Best Editing 
  – The Element of Crime

Best Sound Design 
 Morten Degnbol – The Element of Crime

Best Score 
 Kim Larsen – Midt om natten

Best Documentary Short 
  –

Best Foreign Film 
 Amadeus – Miloš Forman

See also 

 1985 Bodil Awards

References

External links 
  

1980s in Copenhagen
1984 film awards
1985 in Denmark
Robert Awards ceremonies